Based in Scarborough, Ontario, the Canadian–Muslim Civil Liberties Association is an independent monitoring group that advises on private and public sector policy.

They have rejected mujahideen preaching by individuals such as Osama bin Laden.

They are represented by General Counsel Faisal Kutty.

References

Islamic organizations based in Canada
Organizations based in Toronto
Scarborough, Toronto
1994 establishments in Ontario
Organizations established in 1994